Down Below may refer to:
 Down Below (The Cruel Sea album), 1989, and its title track
 Down Below (Tribulation album), 2018 
 Down Below, a 2004 album by Steve Zing
"Down Below", a song by Pantera from the 1985 album I Am the Night 
"Down Below", a song by Pantera from the 1988 album Power Metal
"Down Below", a song about London's sewers, written by Sydney Carter

See also
Downbelow (disambiguation)
Fire Down Below (disambiguation)